Mangakiki is a village on the northwest coast of Guadalcanal, Solomon Islands. Maravovo is in close proximity to Maravovo.

References

Populated places in Guadalcanal Province